The Court of Cassation is the main court of last resort in the Democratic Republic of the Congo. It has its seat in the Kinshasa Palace of Justice.

The Court judges final appeals with respect to the "normal" system of justice, excluding cases of administrative justice, which go before the Conseil d'État.

The court consists of 26 justices, organized into legislative and judiciary sections. Judges are nominated by the Judicial Service Council, a separate and independent body composed of judges from the lower courts and public prosecutors. The first president of the Court of Cassation also sits on the General Assembly, which makes decisions on matters within the scope of the Supreme Council of the Judiciary (CSM). Per Congolese law, the compulsory retirement age for magistrates on the Court of Cassation is 70 years old.

See also
Constitutional Court of the Democratic Republic of the Congo

References 

Law of the Democratic Republic of the Congo
Congo, Democratic Republic
Judiciary of the Democratic Republic of the Congo
Kinshasa